Gillet Herstal was a Belgian manufacturer of motorcycles and automobiles based in Herstal.

Company history
Started in 1919 as with the production of motorcycles, Gillet Herstal ended its production in 1959.

Automotive

From 1928 to 1929 Gillet Herstal produced a three-wheeled car, which was equipped with a motorcycle engine.  On 22 September 1929 in Malle, one of these vehicles held the land speed record in the Cyclecar 500 category, the speed was 117.647 km/h.

References

 Kupélian, Yvette; Jacques Kupélian, Jacques Sirtaine: Histoire de l’automobile belge. Paul Legrain, Brüssel, Paris, . (in French)

Motorcycles by brand
Motorcycle manufacturers of Belgium
Companies based in Liège Province
Herstal